Patrice Debray (born 25 January 1951) is a member of the National Assembly of France.  He represents the Haute-Saône department, and is a member of the Union for a Popular Movement.

References

1951 births
Living people
Union for a Popular Movement politicians
Deputies of the 13th National Assembly of the French Fifth Republic
Politicians from Bourgogne-Franche-Comté
20th-century French physicians
People from Bitburg-Prüm